Benki Birugali (Firestorm) is a 1984 Indian Kannada-language film, directed by Thiptur Raghu and produced by H. V. Sowbhagya. The film stars Vishnuvardhan, Shankar Nag, Jayanthi and Jayamala. The film has musical score by M. Ranga Rao. This movie was remake of 1968 Bengali film Apanjan.

Cast

Vishnuvardhan as Vishnu
Shankar Nag as Shankar
Jayanthi as Parvathi
Jayamala as Jyothi
Jai Jagadish
Chandrashekar
Sundar Raj
Sudheer
Manu
Arikesari
Dinesh
Shivaram
Musuri Krishnamurthy
 M. S. Umesh
Shakti Prasad
Dheerendra Gopal
Bramhavar
Tomato Somu
Somu
Mysore Lokesh
Raviraj
M. S. Karanth
Master Manjunath as Raja
Anuradha
Rekha Rao
Hemalatha
Ananthalakshmi
Mangala
Baby Shobha

Soundtrack
The music was composed by M. Ranga Rao.

References

External links
 
 

1984 films
1980s Kannada-language films
Films scored by M. Ranga Rao
Kannada remakes of Bengali films